Bernd Rosinger (born 30 August 1989) is a German footballer who plays as a forward for SV Seligenporten.

References

External links
 
 Bernd Rosinger at FuPa

Living people
1989 births
People from Neumarkt in der Oberpfalz
Sportspeople from the Upper Palatinate
German footballers
Association football forwards
1. FC Nürnberg II players
SV Wacker Burghausen players
Sportfreunde Lotte players
FC 08 Homburg players
SV Seligenporten players
3. Liga players
Footballers from Bavaria